Yusupovo (Yosop) is a rural locality (a village) in Aksaitovsky Selsoviet, Tatyshlinsky District, Bashkortostan, Russia. The population was 196 as of 2010. There are two streets.

Geography 
Yusupovo is located 26 km west of Verkhniye Tatyshly (the district's administrative centre) by road. Biz is the nearest rural locality.

References 

Rural localities in Tatyshlinsky District